Angel or Alien is the sixth studio album by American progressive metalcore band Born of Osiris, released on July 2, 2021 through Sumerian Records.

Background and promotion
In February, the album was announced as the first of two Born of Osiris albums the band has written in 2021. In March 2021, the ensemble released a lyric video for "White Nile", the first single from the album, along with a playthrough video released in May. Also in May, "Angel or Alien", the second single from the album, was released, and announced the release of the album for July 2, 2021. On July 1, 2021, one day before the album's release, the third single "Poster Child" was released. A teaser video for the album was posted a week prior, on June 25. Born of Osiris toured in support of Angel or Alien, but due to COVID-19 pandemic restrictions, they have only five shows announced for late July in Texas.

Track listing

Personnel 
Born of Osiris
 Ronnie Canizaro – lead vocals
 Lee McKinney – lead guitar
 Nick Rossi – bass, rhythm guitar
 Joe Buras – keyboards, synthesizers, backing vocals
 Cameron Losch – drums

Production and recording
 Josh Strock – production, vocal engineering
 Matt Dierkes – drum engineering
 Lee McKinney – production, guitar and bass engineering
 Nick Rossi – production, guitar and bass engineering
 Nick Sampson – engineering (tracks 8, 11, 12, 13)
 Jeff Dunne – mixing, mastering

Charts

References 

2021 albums
Born of Osiris albums
Sumerian Records albums